Mexborough Power Station was a coal-fired power station situated on the banks of the River Don, on the border of Mexborough and Denaby, adjoining Doncaster Road, in South Yorkshire, England.

History
The plant was planned by the Yorkshire Electric Power Company in 1939 but construction was delayed by the war. The station became operational in 1945. The site housed four English Electric generating sets of approximately 30 MW each, giving the station a total generating capacity of 120 megawatts (MW). There were four Mitchell stoker-fired boilers and four Richardson Westgarth boilers. There were four substantial chimneys giving this local landmark its distinctive appearance. The boilers had the combined capacity to produce 1,260,000 lb/h (158.8 kg/s) of steam at 600 psi (41.4 bar) and 454 °C.

The electricity generating capacity and output of the power station is shown in the table.

The power station closed on 26 October 1981, with a generating capacity of 113 MW. The station was demolished in 1988. The demolition of the station sparked local interest when one of the giant chimneys was toppled accidentally and fell across the site, prematurely demolishing much of it. Contamination at the site was a concern

Many homes were purchased by HS2 with residents being left in negative equity.  
However, in November 2021 it was confirmed by the Government that the 'Eastern Leg' of HS2 would not be constructed, with the line terminating at East Midlands Parkway, ultimately meaning that the compulsory purchasing of homes on the Shimmer estate was not required.

References

Coal-fired power stations in England
Mexborough
Power stations in Yorkshire and the Humber
Demolished power stations in the United Kingdom
Buildings and structures demolished in 1988